Death Sentence is a 1968 Spaghetti Western directed by Mario Lanfranchi and starring Richard Conte.

Plot
The rancher Diaz, the gambler Montero, the hypocrite clergyman Baldwin  and the mentally distorted rover O'Hara are all former bandits.

Cast
 Robin Clarke as Cash
 Richard Conte as Diaz
 Enrico Maria Salerno as Montero
 Adolfo Celi as Friar Baldwin
 Tomas Milian as O'Hara, the Albino
 Eleonor Brown 
 Lilli Lembo
 Luciano Rossi
 Monica Pardo
 Glauco Scarlini
 Giorgio Gruden 
 Umberto Di Grazia
 Dony Baster
 Silvana Bacci
 Raffaele Di Mario
 Claudio Trionfi

References

External links

1968 films
1968 Western (genre) films
1960s Italian-language films
Spaghetti Western films
Films directed by Mario Lanfranchi
Albinism in popular culture
Films shot in Almería
Films scored by Gianni Ferrio
1960s Italian films